Chiara R. Nappi is an Italian physicist.  Her research areas have included mathematical physics, particle physics, and string theory.

Academic career
Nappi obtained the Diploma della Scuola di Perfezionamento in physics from the University of Naples in 1976. Her advisor was Giovanni Jona-Lasinio of the University of Rome. She moved to the United States to carry out academic research, first at Harvard University, and later at Princeton University and the Institute for Advanced Study. She has since been a professor of physics at the University of Southern California (1999–2001) and Princeton University (2001–present). In May 2013, Nappi obtained emerita status in Princeton.

Research
Chiara Nappi's early work focused on rigorous statistical mechanics. Her work with R. Figari and R. Hoegh-Krohn resulted in one of the first proposals of a thermal interpretation of quantum field theory in de Sitter space. In the 1980s, with G. Adkins and E. Witten, she investigated the static properties of baryons in the Skyrme model, and with A. Abouelsaood, C. G. Callan, and S. A. Yost, she worked on the behavior of open strings in background electromagnetic fields.  She has also contributed to the analysis of black hole solutions and noncommutativity in string theory and integrability in string theories and gauge theories. Nappi has also written a number of articles on education and women in science.

Personal life
Nappi is married to Edward Witten, a mathematical physicist and professor at the Institute for Advanced Study in Princeton, New Jersey.  They have three children, Ilana, Daniela, and Rafael.

References

20th-century American physicists
20th-century Italian physicists
20th-century American women scientists
21st-century American physicists
21st-century American women scientists
American women physicists
Italian women physicists
Particle physicists
Theoretical physicists
Living people
Harvard University staff
Place of birth missing (living people)
Year of birth missing (living people)
University of Southern California faculty
Princeton University faculty
Italian emigrants to the United States
American women academics